Ribonuclease 4 is an enzyme that in humans is encoded by the RNASE4 gene.

Function 
The protein encoded by this gene belongs to the pancreatic ribonuclease family. Secreted ribonucleases are the only enzyme family that is vertebrate-specific. Among the 13 members of this superfamily, ribonuclease 4 (RNase 4), is the most conserved gene across different vertebrate species. The human form of RNase 4 is an intracellular and plasma enzyme which was first isolated from colon adenocarcinoma cell line HT-29. It can be found in the pancreas, saliva, and the liver, displaying a similar distribution pattern to that of angiogenin (ANG).  It plays an important role in mRNA cleavage and has marked specificity towards the 3' side of uridine nucleotides. 

Alternative splicing results in two transcript variants encoding the same protein. RNase 4 is co-expressed and shares the same promoter with angiogenin (ANG), another member of this superfamily. Each gene splices to a unique downstream exon that contains its complete coding region. RNase 4 has also been studied in its involvement with amyotrophic lateral sclerosis (ALS), a nervous system disease, due to its similarity with ANG which has been associated with ALS pathogenesis.

Structure 

RNase 4 features a unique structure compared to its homologous enzymes in the superfamily. It contains 119 amino acid residues making it the shortest known human RNase and contains no N-glycosylation sites. RNase 4 displays an α + β type polypeptide chain folding and a V-shape with the active site cleft in the middle. It contains three α-helices and four β -strands while the secondary structures are connected by six loops. There are four disulfide bridges located throughout the structure that connect the α-helices, β -strands, and loops. The overall structure of RNase 4 is similar to its homologous enzyme RNase A, EDN, and angiogenin.

A shorter C terminus is a unique feature of RNase 4 which places the carboxy terminus in the pyrimidine recognition site which results in RNase 4 unique specificity. The pyrimidine recognition site is where there are major difference compared to its homologous enzymes. It contains an arginine residue at position 101, a phenylalanine reside at 42, and a threonine residue at 44. These residues contribute to the ribonuclease 4 specificity and are adapted to recognize a uridine-type base over cytidine-containing substrates.

References

Further reading 

 
 
 
 
 
 
 

EC 3.1.27